The Authentic Costeño Autonomy Movement (Spanish: Movimiento Auténtico Autónomo Costeño - MAAC) is a regional Nicaraguan political party founded in 1993 by Faran Dometz Hebbert, a Moravian pastor from Pearl Lagoon and former director of the Moravian High School in Bluefields. MAAC represents the Creole establishment. The MAAC contested in the 1994 Atlantic Coast Regional Elections and won 2 seats (out of 45) in the RAAS Regional Council.

References

Political parties established in 1993
Political parties in Nicaragua
1993 establishments in Nicaragua
Regionalist parties